North Kordofan is one of the 18 wilayat or states of Sudan. It has an area of 185,302 km2 and an estimated population of 2,920,890 (2008 census) (3,340,000 (2011 estimate)). El-Obeid is the capital of the state.

North Kordofan is generally arid and desert.

History 
For centuries, North Kordofan was inhabited by nomads and pastoralists, mainly the Dar Hamid, Dar Hamar, Guamaa, Kababish, Bideriya, Shwehat and including the Yazeed tribes. The area has had almost continuous drought since the mid-1960s. Deforestation led to the destruction of the natural vegetation. NGOs working in the villages of Sudan tried to rectify the damage. They set up women's centres. These centres allowed many women gain an income. Training was introduced and a solar energy system set up. NGOs recognise that a need exists for longer projects requiring the kind of support that only can come from governments and large agencies.

The singer Hawa Al-Tagtaga is from the region.

Cities and towns in North Kordofan 

Al-Ubayyid
En Nahud
Er Rahad
Umm Ruwaba
Bara
Gibaish
Sodari
Abu Zabad
Umm Dam

See also 
 2007 Sudan floods
 Kordofan — overall region.

References 

 
States of Sudan